Joseph Aloysius Conry (September 12, 1868 – June 22, 1943) was an American politician that served as a United States representative from Massachusetts.  Although he served only a single term, he received national attention for his reformist views. He remained a highly popular speaker and writer, despite losing an election to Congress in 1908. Before serving in Congress, he held municipal office in Boston.

Russia named him Consul to the United States in 1912, a position in which he served until 1919. He was also director of the Port of Boston from 1911 to 1916.

Early career
Conry was born in Brookline, Massachusetts, on September 12, 1868.  He attended the common schools, studied law, was admitted to the bar and commenced practice in Boston.

Municipal government
Conry served from 1895 through 1897 as a member of the Boston Common Council from ward 2. He served as president of the Common Council in 1896 and 1897. Conry served on the Boston Board of Aldermen in 1898, and was the chairman of the board.

United States Congress
Conry was elected as a Democrat to the United States House of Representatives for the 57th United States Congress (March 4, 1901 – March 3, 1903). He was an unsuccessful candidate for reelection in 1902 to the 58th United States Congress, and resumed the practice of his profession in Boston.

Defeats in the 1908 congressional election
In 1908 Conry was an unsuccessful candidate for the Democratic congressional nomination in Massachusetts's 9th congressional district.  Conry first lost in the Democratic primary, and in the general election as an independent candidate, losing both times to John A. Keliher.

Consul to the United States from Russia
He was recognized as consul of Russia in September 1912 and served until 1919. Conry was decorated by Czar Nicholas II, and was made a member of the Knights of St. Anne.

Later career

Conry served as director of the Port of Boston from 1911 to 1916. He served as special attorney for the United States Maritime Commission in Washington, D.C., in 1938 and 1939, then practiced law there.

Death and burial
Conry died at George Washington University Hospital in Washington, D.C. June 22, 1943. He was interred at Mount Olivet Cemetery in Washington, D.C.

References
 
Contested Election case of Joseph A. Conry vs. John A. Keliher

Notes

External links

 
 

1868 births
1943 deaths
Politicians from Brookline, Massachusetts
Boston City Council members
Burials at Mount Olivet Cemetery (Washington, D.C.)
Democratic Party members of the United States House of Representatives from Massachusetts